Kandulapalem or Kandula Palem is a village located in Ramachandrapuram mandal in East Godavari district of Andhra Pradesh, India.

References

Villages in East Godavari district